Inkaar is a Pakistani television series, produced by Momina Duraid under her banner MD Productions. The series airs weekly on Hum TV every Monday replacing Aatish. It stars Yumna Zaidi, Imran Ashraf, Sami Khan and Rehan Sheikh. The series revolves around the plight, sufferings and ultimate fight of a girl against the corrupt and flawed justice system. The series was loosely based on the real-life incident of Khadija Siddiqui, who was stabbed by her class fellow in broad daylight.

It aired on Hum Pashto 1 in Pashto language under the same title. The serial aired on "Zindagi" in India from 23 February 2023, under the same title.

Inkkar received positive reviews and received praise for Zaidi and Sheikh's performance. The series was nominated in 6 categories at 19th Lux Style Awards and won Best Actress - Viewer's choice for Zaidi.

Plot
Inkaar is about a story of a girl Hajra who comes from a middle-class background and studies in a university. She wants to fulfill her dreams and Her father Haji Ilyas fully supports her. Hajra falls in love with Rehan Chaudhary. Rehan was a friend of Shayan. One day, Rehan Chaudhary calls Hajra to Shayan house and try to rape her. Shayan reaches there and saves Hajra. The whole matter closes there because things come on Hajra's honor (izzat). Hajra leaves the university without telling anyone anything. Shayan tells his parents that he loves Hajra, his university fellow, and wants to marry her. Firstly, Shayan's father disagrees due to class difference but further on he agrees. Hajra resists to the proposal as she is mentally disturbed due to the incident with Rehan. The story unfolds and she tells Shayan about what happened with her. Shayan tells her he has no problem with her past and that he still loves her and wants to marry her. They both get engaged. On the other side, when Rehan learns of their engagement, he becomes angry; he wanted Hajra because he is obsessed with her. He tries to blackmail Hajra and forces her to break the engagement, but she rejects him repeatedly. He finally tells her the house he called her and tried to rape her belongs to Shayan and not Rehan. And that Shayan is Rehan's childhood friend, and he knew everything about them already. Furious and shocked Hajra goes to Shayan's house just to realize that this is the same house. She believes what Rehan said and breaks her engagement. Shayan after many efforts convince her to listen to her part of the story in Rehan's presence to clear his position. She agrees to meet him. In the presence of Rehan, Shayan tells Hajra that he has been madly in love with her since he first saw her. He was shy by nature, so he asked Rehan to help him and tell her about his feelings. Rehan, however, trapped Hajra pretending to be in love with her and tried to get the advantage of her. All that time, he lied to Shayan that he has befriended Hajra to convince her for Shayan's proposal. In the end, Rehan told Shayan that Hajra is not a girl with good character and to prove that to him he called Hajra at Shayan's home, pretending to be ill and tried to rape her. Shayan saves her by stopping Rehan and Hajra escaped without knowing who saved her from Rehan. After telling the whole story he asks Hajra to take whatever decision she wants and that he will stand with her every decision. Hajra decides to be with Shayan and they are set to get married. On Shayan and Hajra's marriage day, Rehan arrives in beauty salon where Hajra was getting ready. He tries that Hajra runs away with him, but Hajra rejects him by saying No Means No. This infuriates Rehan and he stabs her with scissors 25 times. Hajra is saved but the case goes to court and then starts the war of honor between Hajra and Rehan, where Rehan and his mother using all their influences and power try to prove Hajra to be a characterless girl. At the end, Rehan is sent to jail when a video showing what happened was seen by everyone in the courthouse. Rehan was given 7 years in prison and justice could be served but Hajra forgives him in court because she said she made a promise to Rehan's mom that if she had the chance, Hajra would forgive him. She asks that Rehan be sent to live with his mom so he can learn how to respect other women. At the end, Hajra and Shayan are together, and everyone is happy for Hajra's win. Rehan is with his mom and begs for her to save him and cries at his feet.

Cast
 Yumna Zaidi as Hajra
 Imran Ashraf as Rehan Chaudhry
 Sami Khan as Shayan Malik
 Rehan Sheikh as Hafiz Ilyas Sahab
 Noor ul Hassan as Malik Sahab
 Rizwan Riaz as Ibrar Hussain journalist
 Imran Peerzada as Wajahat Chaudhry; Rehan's father
 Munazzah Arif as Rehan's stepmother
 Kinza Malik as Zulekha
 Haseeb Muhammad Bin Qasim as University Professor
 Ali Tahir as Azam Iqbal
 Jazib Akram as Jawad
 Nabeela Khan as Shayan's mother
 Iftikhar Iffi as Gullu Badshah
 Saima Noreen as Mrs. Wajahat Chaudhry; Rehan's biological mother
 Saima Saleem
 Zaryab Haider
 Sarfaraz Ansari
 Dua Khan
 Sehraab Afgan
 Rana Aftab
 Wasim Akram
 Tariq Prince
 Shamma Rana
 Vashma Fatima
 Nimmal Fatima
 Saba Shahid
 Shiza Khan
 Qamar Shifa
 Raja Nasir
 Shahid Khan
 Azam Butt
 Masood Khan
 Abdul Hadi

Production

Background 
The series marked the third collaboration of writer Zafar Mairaj and director Kashif Nisar, after Dumpukht - Aatish-e-Ishq and Lashkara.

It marked seventh on-screen appearance of Sami Khan with Yumna Zaidi after Khushi Ek Roag, Teri Raah Main Rul Gai, Meri Dulari, Dil Mohallay Ki Haveli, Kaanch Ki Guriya and Paras while fifth on-screen appearance of Noor Ul Jassan and Kinza Malik after Sammi, Alif Allah Aur Insaan, Dar Si Jaati Hai Sila and Lashkara.

Reception
Yumna Zaidi's performance was highly acclaimed in whole drama. Despite being low on ratings, Inkaar received critical acclaim and highly positive reviews from critics due to its realistic portrayal and brilliant performances. Rehan Sheikh's portrayal as a supporting and progressive father who stands by his daughter, was well received. However, critics panned the conclusion of the series, and termed it as regressive and unsatisfactory.

Awards and nominations

References

External links

Official website

2019 Pakistani television series debuts
MD Productions
2019 Pakistani television series endings
Hum TV
Hum Network Limited
Hum TV original programming
Urdu-language television shows
Pakistani drama television series
Television series set in Lahore
Television series set in Punjab, Pakistan